Austin Historic District may refer to:

Austin Historic District (Chicago, Illinois), listed on the National Register of Historic Places in Chicago, Illinois
Austin Town Hall Park Historic District, listed on the NRHP in Chicago, Illinois
Austin Historic District (Austin, Nevada), listed on the National Register of Historic Places in Lander County, Nevada
Austin Farm Road Agricultural Area, a historic district listed on the NRHP in Exeter, Rhode Island
Old West Austin Historic District, Austin, Texas, listed on the NRHP in Texas

See also
Austinberg Historic District, Covington, Kentucky, listed on the National Register of Historic Places in Kenton County, Kentucky